Hudson Cotton Manufacturing Company, also known as Shuford Mills, is a historic textile mill located at Hudson, Caldwell County, North Carolina.  It was built in stages between 1904 and 1992, and is a large, one-story, brick (both solid and veneered) building of nearly 180,000 square feet.  It features a three-stage, square, brick tower built as part of the original, 1904, construction.

It was listed on the National Register of Historic Places in 2013.

References

Industrial buildings and structures on the National Register of Historic Places in North Carolina
Industrial buildings completed in 1904
Buildings and structures in Caldwell County, North Carolina
National Register of Historic Places in Caldwell County, North Carolina